Mohamed Bradja (born 16 November 1969) is a former professional footballer who played as a centre-back. Born in France, at international level he represented Algeria, participating at the 2002 African Cup of Nations.

Club career
Born in Troyes, Bradja began playing football at his hometown club. Due to the lack of stability after the bankruptcy of Troyes Aube Football, he left in 1986 to join US Valenciennes as a trainee.

After two seasons, failing to win a professional contract, Bradja returned to Troyes and to the newly created Troyes AC, at regional level. He helped the club in achieving promotions from National 2 to Ligue 2 in only six years. He gained a professional contract with the club, and, three years after, secured the promotion of the club to the French top flight, Ligue 1, for the first time in almost 20 years. Even if he played less during the next seasons, he kept his place in the first team. With Troyes, he also played European football, winning the UEFA Intertoto Cup in 2001 by beating Newcastle United. He ended his career at the end of the 2002–03 season, when Troyes finished bottom of the Ligue 1 and were relegated to Ligue 2. He also captained the team on several occasions.

He was nicknamed "Momo".

International career
Bradja represented Algeria at international level. He played in a 4–1 loss against France. In 2002, he participated at the African Cup of Nations. In total, he made ten appearances.

Coaching career
One of the longest servants of the club, he was offered several roles in the technical staff after his retirement. He was a scout for the club, before being appointed first-team coach during the management of Ludovic Batelli.

He was once again assistant manager after the comeback of Jean-Marc Furlan in 2010. In December 2015, he became interim manager after Furlan's dismissal.

Honours
Troyes
UEFA Intertoto Cup: 2001

References

External links
 
 
 
 Biography at Troyes AC official site
 

Living people
1969 births
Footballers from Grand Est
Sportspeople from Troyes
Association football central defenders
French footballers
Algerian footballers
Algeria international footballers
French sportspeople of Algerian descent
2002 African Cup of Nations players
ES Troyes AC players
Ligue 1 players
Ligue 2 players
Algerian football managers
French football managers
ES Troyes AC managers